GSI may refer to:

Science and technology

 Geological Strength Index
 Gonadosomatic Index
 UK Government Secure Intranet 
 Grid Security Infrastructure, a computer networking specification

Businesses and organizations

Businesses
 Gemological Science International, gemstone identification/grading/appraisal services
 Geophysical Service Incorporated, an American petroleum exploration corporation
 Guangzhou Shipyard International, a Chinese state-owned shipbuilder
 GSI Commerce, now eBay Enterprise, an American e-commerce company

Scientific organizations
 GSI Helmholtz Centre for Heavy Ion Research, Germany
 Geographical Society of Ireland
 Geospatial Information Authority of Japan
 Geological Survey of India
 Geological Survey of Ireland

Other organizations
 Gabinete de Segurança Institucional da presidência da república (Institutional Security Cabinet), Brazil
 Gustav Stresemann Institute, a German educational charity

Other uses
 Graduate student instructor,  a teaching fellow at some US universities
 Grand-Santi Airport, French Guiana (IATA code GSI)